Darc is a 2018 American thriller film starring Tony Schiena, Armand Assante, Sho Ikushima, Kippei Shiina and Tetsu Watanabe.

Plot
To bring down a global human trafficking ring, an Interpol agent recruits the help of a brutal criminal with inside knowledge of the yakuza.

Cast 
 Tony Schiena as Darc, the main protagonist  of the movie, he is a brutal criminal with martial arts skills and an unquenchable thirst for revenge.
 Armand Assante as Lafique, an Interpol agent who seeks to take down a global human trafficking ring to save his own daughter.
 Sho Ikushima as Shigeru Kageyama (Nihongo: 影山茂, Kageyama Shigeru), an Yakuza heir, son of Toshio Kageyama and grandson of Ginzo Kageyama, the powerful head (Oyabun/Kumicho) of Koda-kai. He is the one who hires Darc as his bodyguard after a confrontation with a rival gang.
 Kippei Shiina as Toshio Kageyama (Nihongo: 影山敏夫, Kageyama Toshio), the main antagonist of the movie, he is a Japanese businessman who is actually a high-ranking leader of the Koga-kai, a powerful yakuza syndicate and who is responsible for the murder of Darc's mother. He is also the son of Ginzo Kageyama and the father of Shigeru Kageyama.
 Tetsu Watanabe as Ginzo Kageyama (Nihongo: 影山銀蔵, Kageyama Ginzō), a powerful yakuza boss. He is the head of the Koga-kai, a powerful yakuza syndicate based in Japan and the US and has a bloody past involving the film's protagonist, Darc. He is also the father of Toshio Kageyama and grandfather of Shigeru Kageyama.

Accolades

References

External links 
 
 

American thriller films
Yakuza films
2018 films
2010s American films
2010s Japanese films